Jakobi Meyers (born November 9, 1996) is an American football wide receiver for the Las Vegas Raiders of the National Football League (NFL). He played college football at NC State and signed with the New England Patriots as an undrafted free agent in 2019.

Early years
Meyers attended and played high school football at Arabia Mountain High School in Lithonia, Georgia.

College career
Meyers played at NC State from 2015 to 2018. Initially recruited as a quarterback, Meyers transitioned to receiver following his freshman year in which he redshirted and was a key member of the scout team. During his career he had 168 receptions for 1,932 yards and nine touchdowns. After his junior season, he entered the 2019 NFL Draft. Meyers’ 92 receptions in 2018 broke Torry Holt's single season receptions record for NC State.

College career statistics

Professional career

New England Patriots

2019
Meyers signed with the New England Patriots as an undrafted free agent in 2019. He debuted in the Patriots' preseason opener against the Detroit Lions, recording a game-high six catches for 69 yards and two touchdowns in a Patriots 31–3 win. In the Patriot's second preseason game, against the Tennessee Titans, Meyers again had a game-high six catches for 82 yards; he also had a two-point conversion reception in the 22–17 win for New England. In Week 1, against the Pittsburgh Steelers, in his regular-season debut, Meyers had one reception for 22 yards in a 33–3 win. Overall, Meyers recorded 26 receptions for 359 receiving yards as a rookie.

2020
In Week 9 of the 2020 season, against the New York Jets on Monday Night Football, he recorded a career-high with 12 receptions for 169 yards, including a 20-yard catch to set up Nick Folk's game-winning 51-yard field goal as the Patriots won 30–27. In Week 10 against the Baltimore Ravens on NBC Sunday Night Football, Meyers led the Patriots with five catches for 59 yards and recorded a 24-yard passing touchdown to running back Rex Burkhead during the 23–17 win.
In Week 15 against the Miami Dolphins, Meyers recorded seven catches for 111 yards during the 22–12 loss. In Week 17 against the New York Jets, Meyers recorded 5 catches for 57 yards and a 19-yard passing touchdown on a reverse trick play to quarterback Cam Newton, identical to his passing touchdown earlier in the season. The Patriots won 28–14.  Meyers finished the season with 59 receptions for 729 yards, and while he had yet to record the first touchdown reception of his career, he did throw two touchdown passes.

2021 
Meyers scored his first receiving touchdown in Week 10 on an 11-yard pass from Brian Hoyer in the fourth quarter of a 45-7 win over the Cleveland Browns. At the time, Meyers held the modern NFL record for the most receptions (134) and receiving yards (1,560) to start a career without scoring a touchdown. Meyers caught his second touchdown in Week 17 of the season on a 4-yard pass from Mac Jones, adding to an already productive outing, catching all eight of his targets for 73 yards against the Jaguars. After a 70-yard outing in the season finale against the Dolphins, Meyers finished his third season with multiple career highs, as well as leading the team in receptions (83) and receiving yards (866).

2022
On March 13, 2022, the Patriots placed a second-round restricted free agent tender on Meyers. Meyers signed the second-round tender on June 13, 2022, worth $3.9 million.

At the end of a tied Week 15 game against the Las Vegas Raiders, on the last play of the game, Meyers threw a backwards lateral targeted towards Mac Jones after taking a prior lateral from teammate Rhamondre Stevenson. The pass was off the mark and intercepted by Chandler Jones, allowing the Raiders to win on a walk-off touchdown in the 30-24 loss. Post-game, Meyers said in response to his play: “I was trying to do too much…Trying to be a hero, I guess”.

Meyers finished the season as the team's leading receiver with 67 catches for 804 yards and six touchdowns.

Las Vegas Raiders
On March 16, 2023, Meyers signed a three-year contract with the Las Vegas Raiders.

NFL career statistics

Regular season

References

External links

New England Patriots bio
NC State Wolfpack bio

1996 births
Living people
American football wide receivers
Las Vegas Raiders players
NC State Wolfpack football players
New England Patriots players
People from Lithonia, Georgia
Players of American football from Georgia (U.S. state)
Sportspeople from DeKalb County, Georgia
Ed Block Courage Award recipients